Sylvia Braverman (March 14, 1918 – 2013) was an American artist known for her drawings and paintings.

Her work is included in the collections of the Seattle Art Museum, the Pennsylvania Academy of Fine Arts and the Princeton University Art Museum.

In her later life, she lived and worked in Vence, France, where she died in 2013 at the age of 95.

References

1918 births
2013 deaths
20th-century American women artists
Pennsylvania Academy of the Fine Arts
Princeton University Art Museum
Seattle Art Museum
American expatriates in France
21st-century American women